Visaltiakos Football Club is a Greek football club, based in Nigrita, Serres Prefecture, Central Macedonia.

The association was founded in 1998. In 2009, they promoted to Gamma Ethniki.

Football clubs in Central Macedonia
Association football clubs established in 1998
1998 establishments in Greece